Sree Anantha Padmanabha Arts, Science and Commerce College is one of the famous Colleges in Telangana. It was established in the year 1968 at Vikarabad, Ranga Reddy district by former Chief Minister Marri Chenna Reddy.

History
‘The Vikas Mandali’ was formed in the year 1965 under the Chairmanship of Late Dr. M. Channa Reddy with lofty donations raised from the farmers and the local businessmen. The College was inaugurated by Late Sri. Kasu Brahmananda Reddy – the former Chief Minister of Andhra Pradesh. This college was started with the encouragement of the local elite on a spacious area of 43 acres, was admitted to grant-in-aid in 1972. They have been receiving the salaries of the staff from the State Government and the development grants from the University Grants Commission.

The Vikas Mandali was established to bring about an amelioration of the people of this backward area in Social and Educational aspects.
The College is managed by a Committee, appointed by the Vikas Mandali, presently headed by Sri. M. Ravindra Reddy as its Chairman.

The College is affiliated to Osmania University in the year 1987 (vide Lr. No. 2266H/ 1143/69/Acadm, dt: 05.07.1988). The College is identified under sections  2(f) & 12B  of the UGC Act, 1956.  The College is a multi-faculty institution offering instruction in both the media, Telugu & English at Degree level in addition to PG in Commerce and Mathematics. The College has been assessed and accredited by the NAAC (National Assessment and Accreditation Council) with B++ grade in 2007.

Principals
 B. Yadagiri Reddy
 Basant Raj
 Dr. T. Veeraiah
 Dr. S. Sudhakar Reddy
 Dr. G. Anjaiah
 Shiva Prakash Patlolla 2013 - November 2014
 Dr. D. Dathathreya Reddy (Sept 2015 to Mar 2016) 
 Dr. Dr. K. Narsing Rao (Sep 2016 to Nov 2016)
 Dr. Dr. S. Manohar Rao (Dec 2016 to Oct 2018)
 Dr. J. Mandarika (Oct 2018 to Till Date).

Facilities
The College is located on a spacious campus of 40 acres. The College has its own building with 40 classrooms, 12 laboratories, 8 storerooms, 5 library rooms, a games room, gymnasium, girls waiting room, and canteen.  There is a separate block containing the Chairman's chamber, conference hall, Principal's chamber, office, 3 staff rooms, N.S.S. room, N.C.C. room, and scholarship room.  A seminar hall with modern amenities such as an LCD projector and other audiovisual equipment is provided for conducting lectures, staff meetings, and literary and cultural competitions.  There is a separate building on the campus with a carpet area of 6636 square feet for postgraduate courses.

Departments
 Department of Botany
 Department of Chemistry
 Department of Commerce
 Department of Economics
 Department of English
 Department of Hindi
 Department of History
 Department of Mathematics
 Department of Physical Education
 Department of Physics
 Department of Public Administration	
 Department of Telugu
 Department of Zoology

Courses offered

Undergraduate
 Bachelor of Arts (B.A.)
 Bachelor of Commerce (B.Com.)
 Bachelor of Science (B.Sc.)

Postgraduate
 Master of Commerce (M.Com.)
 Master of Science (M.Sc.)

See also 
Education in India
Literacy in India
List of institutions of higher education in Telangana

References

External links

Ranga Reddy district
Educational institutions established in 1968
1968 establishments in Andhra Pradesh